Oshrat is a community settlement in  northern Israel. Located in the Western Galilee to the south-east of Nahariya and just north of Kafr Yasif, it falls under the jurisdiction of Mateh Asher Regional Council.

The village was established in 1983 as an expansion of Moshav Amka.

Etymology
Oshrat is a variation of the word Asher, the tribe on the lands of which the village stands. The founders used the word construction of Biblical names like Osnat, Tzafnat, etc.

References

Community settlements
Populated places established in 1983
Populated places in Northern District (Israel)
1983 establishments in Israel